Storm Season is the fourth studio album by the Norwegian progressive rock band White Willow. It is the last album to feature Sylvia Erichsen  (currently known as Sylvia Skjellestad) on vocals until her return on 2011's Terminal Twilight.

Track listing
All songs have been composed by Jacob Holm-Lupo except where noted.
 "Chemical Sunset" (Holm-Lupo, Traditional) – 7:58
 "Sally Left" – 6:33
 Voice – Teresa K. Aslanian
 "Endless Science" – 3:37
 "Soulburn" – 9:21
 Vocals – Finn Coren
 "Insomnia" – 5:49
 "Storm Season" (Lars Fredrik Frøislie) – 4:21
 "Nightside of Eden" (Holm-Lupo, Johannes Sæbøe) – 9:44
 "Headlights" (Japanese bonus track) – 6:22

Personnel
 Marthe Berger Walthinsen – bass, tambourine
 Sigrun Eng – cello
 Aage Moltke Schou – drums, percussion
 Johannes Sæbøe – electric guitar
 Jacob Holm-Lupo – electric guitar, acoustic guitar, keyboards
 Ketil Vestrum Einarsen – flute, synthesizer, tambourine 
 Lars Fredrik Frøislie – piano, keyboards, synthesizer, electric piano, glockenspiel
 Sylvia Erichsen – vocals
 Øystein Vesaas – engineer

References

External links
WHITE WILLOW Storm Season music reviews and MP3 @ progarchives.com
 Storm Season on Myspace

2004 albums
White Willow (band) albums